Hathazari is an upazila of Chattogram District in Chattogram Division, Bangladesh.

Geography
It has 52,594 households and a total area of 251.28 km2. The main river is Halda. It is surrounded by Fatikchhari Upazila on the north, Panchlaish Thana and Chandgaon Thana on the south, Raozan Upazila on the east and Sitakunda Upazila on the west.

History

Part of the ancient kingdom of Harikela, 36 thin bull-and-triglyph silver coins were discovered inside a little clay pot in Hathazari's Jobra village in July 1980. All, except one, mentioned the kingdom of Harikela. The Kingdom of Mrauk U built numerous mudforts in present-day Hathazari.

In the fifteenth century, the Sultan of Bengal Shamsuddin Yusuf Shah had a mosque constructed in Dewannagar mouza which is now known as Faqir Mosque. During an expedition against the Arakanese in the early 16th century, Prince Nasiruddin Nasrat Shah passed through the area where he dug a reservoir and built a mosque which still stands today in Chikandandi Union. During the Mughal period, present-day Hathazari was a part of the Aurangabad Pargana. 12 hazaris were appointed to keep law and order and defend the pargana of Aurangabad. Due to Aurangabad being so far away from Murshidabad, the erstwhile capital of the Nawabs of Bengal, the hazaris neglected their duties. The Nawab's representative, Mahasingh, resorted to a ruse to undermine the power of the Hazaris and took the invitation to the Nawab's Kanchari in Sitakunda by cheating with the help of a trick. He was able to betray and capture eight of the twelve Hazaris and send them to Murshidabad. Two of the ten remaining Hazaris surrendered and were excused. The Nawab of Bengal imprisoned the eight Hazaris in iron cages and ordered them to be drowned in the Ganges. One of the excused Hazaris, Bir Singh Hazari, established a haat bazaar in the area and so it came to be known as Hathazari (The haat/market of the Hazari).

Hathazari Thana (an area controlled by a police station) was formed in 1929. The following year, it was the site of a battle between Bengali revolutionaries led by Surya Sen and Ananta Singh, and British Indian Army soldiers. Four days earlier, the revolutionaries had carried out the Chittagong armoury raid. British forces caught up with them at Jalalabad Hill. In the ensuing fight over 80 soldiers and 12 revolutionaries were killed. Sen dispersed his men to neighbouring villages in small groups, allowing some to escape or delay capture.

During the Burma campaign 1944–45, the United States Army Air Forces used the Hathazari Airfield as a supply point and staging airfield for resupply airlift drops over Burma and also as a radio relay station. During the Bangladesh Liberation War of 1971, 11 Bengali freedom fighters were murdered near Nazirhat Bus Stand. The Nobel Prize-recognised Grameen Bank was established in the village of Jobra through a rural banking project there. Hathazari Thana was made an upazila in 1983.

Demographics

According to the 2011 Bangladesh census, Hathazari had a total population of 431,748 with 215,201 Males and 226,547 Females. Most of the people immigrate largely in Saudi Arabia, the United Arab Emirates and other countries in Europe and the Middle East.

Literacy and education
The average literacy rate of Hathazari is 57.9%; with male percentage being 61.1% and female being 54.6%. Al-Jamiatul Ahlia Darul Ulum Moinul Islam, established in 1896, is the oldest and largest Deobandi institution in the country - ranking among the top ten madrasas in the subcontinent. The public research University of Chittagong in Fatehpur was founded in 1966 and is notable for having the largest campus among the universities of Bangladesh. Hathazari Government University College, the Hathazari research and farm-based campus of the Chittagong Veterinary and Animal Sciences University, Fatehpur Mehernega High School Fatehabad Model Multilateral High School  and Farhadabad High School are also notable educational institutions of Hathazari. The Bangladesh Agricultural Research Institute has a research station in Hathazari.

Administration

Hathazari Upazila is divided into 15 union parishads, further divided into 48 mouzas and 59 villages. The unions are:
 Burischar
 Chhibatali
 Chikandandi
 South Madarsha
 Dhalai
 Fatehpur
 Forhadabad
 Garduara
 Gumanmardan
 Hathazari
 Mekhal
 Mirzapur
 Nangalmora
 Shikarpur
 North Madarsha

Upazila chairmen

Notable people
 Abdul Hamid Madarshahi, Islamic scholar
 Anisul Islam Mahmud, politician
 Habibullah Qurayshi, Islamic scholar
 Mahbubul Alam, award-winning writer
 M Harun-Ar-Rashid, former Chief of Army Staff
 Muhammad Ibrahim, physician
 Muhammad Faizullah, Islamic speaker
 Muhammad Yunus, Nobel Peace Prize laureate
 Syed Muhammad Ibrahim, former army officer and politician
 Syed Wahidul Alam, politician

See also
 Upazilas of Bangladesh
 Districts of Bangladesh
 Divisions of Bangladesh

References

External links